The South Waterfront Greenway is a linear park and urban walkway along the Willamette River in the South Waterfront district of Portland, Oregon, in the United States.

Description and history
The greenway will stretch from the Marquam Bridge south to the River Forum Building. Annual operations and maintenance for the park are expected to cost $489,000. The central segment, first of three to be completed, was opened on May 14, 2015.

References

2015 establishments in Oregon
Parks in Portland, Oregon
Protected areas established in 2015
South Portland, Portland, Oregon
Urban public parks